Matías Cahais (born 24 December 1987) is an Argentine football central defender currently playing for Curicó Unido.

Club career 
Cahais is a product of the Boca Juniors youth team, he made his debut for the first team at the age of 17 on 26 June 2005 in a 0-0 draw with Quilmes Atlético Club.

3 July 2005, Cahais scored his first goal for Boca in a game against Almagro, but it is not recorded as an official goal, as the game was abandoned and the game was awarded to Almagro with a default score of 2-0.

After some offers from European clubs, 21 January 2008, Cahais signed a contract for the Dutch club FC Groningen, initially for a one-year-and-a-half deal, with the possibility of a definitive acquisition for a €2 million price, after the first period. During his presentation ceremony on Groningen, the defender said that, even with the bigger offer from Real Madrid, he opted for signing for a Dutch team because he wanted to make his European career "step for step", and he felt that an Eredivisie club was the right choice to do, as the Dutch league was also the start of the European career of players like Ronaldo, Romário and his compatriot Julio Cruz.

International career
Cahais has represented the Argentina national football team at Under-17 and Under-20 levels. He made 20 appearances for the U-17 team, scoring 4 goals. In 2007, he was selected to play for Argentina at the South American Youth Championship in Paraguay where he scored 2 goals. He also represented the U-20 team at the 2007 FIFA U-20 World Cup.

Honours

References

External links
 Argentine Primera statistics at Fútbol XXI  
 Statistics at Guardian StatsCentre
 Matías Cahais at Soccerway

1987 births
Living people
People from Morón Partido
Argentine footballers
Argentina under-20 international footballers
Argentine expatriate footballers
Association football defenders
Boca Juniors footballers
Gimnasia y Esgrima de Jujuy footballers
Racing Club de Avellaneda footballers
Club Deportivo Universidad Católica footballers
FC Groningen players
Independiente Medellín footballers
C.D. Veracruz footballers
Olimpo footballers
San Martín de Tucumán footballers
Syrianska FC players
O'Higgins F.C. footballers
Curicó Unido footballers
Chilean Primera División players
Argentine Primera División players
Eredivisie players
Categoría Primera A players
Liga MX players
Superettan players
Expatriate footballers in Chile
Expatriate footballers in Mexico
Expatriate footballers in Colombia
Expatriate footballers in the Netherlands
Argentine expatriate sportspeople in the Netherlands
Sportspeople from Buenos Aires Province